Jeffrey William Webb (born July 6, 1948) is an American former professional basketball player.

A 6'4" (1.93 m) guard from Kansas State University, Webb played two seasons (1970–1972) in the National Basketball Association as a member of the Milwaukee Bucks and Phoenix Suns. He averaged 2.1 points per game in his career and won a league championship with Milwaukee in 1971.

External links 

1948 births
Living people
American men's basketball players
Basketball players from Wisconsin
Kansas State Wildcats men's basketball players
Milwaukee Bucks players
People from West Allis, Wisconsin
Phoenix Suns players
Shooting guards
Sportspeople from the Milwaukee metropolitan area
Undrafted National Basketball Association players